Joshua Lennie (born 23 March 1986) is an English retired semi-professional footballer who played as a goalkeeper. He is now a full-time coach and scout in the United States.

Career

Brentford 
Lennie started his career as a junior at Brentford and embarked on a scholarship at the beginning of the 2002–03 season. He received his maiden call into the team squad for a Football League Trophy first round match versus Barnet on 14 October 2003 and remained an unused substitute during the shootout win. Lennie was an unused substitute on another four occasions during the 2003–04 season. Lennie made his professional debut in a Football League Trophy first round match versus Milton Keynes Dons on 28 September 2004. With the game already lost at 3–0, Lennie came on as a half-time substitute for Alan Julian. He was called into the first team squad on another six occasions during the 2004–05 season, but did not play. Lennie was released at the end of the 2004–05 season.

Non-league football 
After his release from Brentford, Lennie dropped into Non-League football. He played for AFC Wimbledon, Harrow Borough, Molesey, Chalfont St Peter, Carshalton Athletic (two spells), Chertsey Town (two spells), Skelmersdale United, Hayes & Yeading United, Salford City, Dorking Wanderers, Bedfont Town, Chester and Wingate & Finchley.

Career statistics

References

External links

1986 births
Living people
English footballers
Association football goalkeepers
Brentford F.C. players
Maidenhead United F.C. players
AFC Wimbledon players
Harrow Borough F.C. players
Chalfont St Peter A.F.C. players
Skelmersdale United F.C. players
Hayes & Yeading United F.C. players
Salford City F.C. players
Chester F.C. players
National League (English football) players
Chertsey Town F.C. players
Carshalton Athletic F.C. players
North Greenford United F.C. players
Molesey F.C. players
Dorking Wanderers F.C. players
Wingate & Finchley F.C. players
Isthmian League players
Southern Football League players
Northern Premier League players
Bedfont Town F.C. players
Footballers from Oxford